Aravathur is a small village in Mannargudi taluk, Tiruvarur district, Tamil Nadu, India.  The name Aravathur is termed from "Aravam" (meaning 'snake'). The main occupation is farming paddy lands. The Mariamman Kovil temple is located here.

External links 
 Google Maps

Villages in Tiruvarur district